is the fourth studio album by Japanese singer Yōko Oginome. Released through Victor Entertainment on April 21, 1986, the album marked Oginome's transition from idol-based kayōkyoku to dance-pop and city pop, following the success of her 1985 single "Dancing Hero (Eat You Up)". It includes the hit single "Flamingo in Paradise", as well as the Bari Bari Densetsu theme song "Slope ni Tenki Ame". The CD release includes the English version of "Dancing Hero" as an exclusive track. It was reissued on March 24, 2010 with five bonus tracks as part of Oginome's 25th anniversary celebration.

The album peaked at No. 4 on Oricon's albums chart and sold over 109,000 copies.

Track listing 

 Track 6 not included in the LP and cassette releases.

Charts

References

External links
 
 
 

1986 albums
Yōko Oginome albums
Japanese-language albums
Victor Entertainment albums